Mike Bohacek is an American politician serving as a member of the Indiana Senate from the 8th district. He assumed office on November 9, 2016.

Education 
Bohacek earned two Bachelor of Science degree in economics and another in accounting and finance from DePaul University.

Career 
From 2004 to 2006, Brohacek worked as a sales manager for YRC Freight. He is also an enterprise consultant with Echo Global Logistics. Bohacek served as a member of the Michiana Shores Town Council and LaPorte County Board of Commissioners. He was elected to the Indiana Senate in November 2016. In 2021, Bohaceck authored a bill that would allow families on Medicaid to have easier access to out-of-state hospitals.

References 

Living people
DePaul University alumni
People from LaPorte County, Indiana
Republican Party Indiana state senators
Year of birth missing (living people)